Kampot Airport  is a public use airport located  northwest of Kampot, Kâmpôt, Cambodia.

See also
List of airports in Cambodia

References

External links 
 Airport record for Kampot Airport at Landings.com

Airports in Cambodia
Buildings and structures in Kampot province